Swordbearer may refer to

 Livonian Brothers of the Sword, also called Christ Knights, Sword Brethren, and The Militia of Christ of Livonia
 The Swordbearer, a 1982 fantasy novel by Glen Cook
 The Sword Bearer, a 2006 Russian action film
 Swordbearer (ceremonial), civic official
 Swordbearer (role-playing game), published by Heritage Games in 1982 and Fantasy Games Unlimited in 1985

See also
 Swordsman
 The Sword Bearer, 2006 Russian action film
 Bearer of the Sword (disambiguation)